Rupert Edward David Whitaker  (born 1963) is a British psychiatrist, immunologist, and patient advocate. He is one of Europe's longest-surviving people with HIV, having contracted the disease in 1981. Following the death of his partner, Terrence Higgins, from AIDS in 1982, he co-founded the Terrence Higgins Trust, a charity set up to provide services for people with HIV. In 2007, he founded the Tuke Institute, an international organisation researching the health-effectiveness of medical services.

Early life
Whitaker came out as gay in 1978. He left Lord Wandsworth College in Long Sutton, Hampshire in 1980, aged 17. In 1981, he matriculated at the College of St Hild and St Bede at Durham University to study philosophy and psychology, and during this period his partner Terry Higgins became one of the first people to die from AIDS in the UK. Whitaker became ill and transferred to the University of London, and was not expected to live longer than 12 months.

The Terrence Higgins Trust
In 1982, Whitaker became involved in raising awareness of HIV, then a little-known disease referred to 'Gay-Related Immune Deficiency'. Following his involvement in a conference organised by London Lesbian and Gay Switchboard, he worked with Martyn Butler and Tony Whitehead to develop the Terrence Higgins Trust into a registered charity, helping to establish its educational, mental health, and buddying services, and raising awareness in the media. The Trust was the first European HIV charity to be founded, and is currently one of the leading HIV charities in Europe.

Training and practice
Following the completion of his first degree in 1984, Whitaker was awarded a fellowship to the University of Toronto, Canada to train in psychiatry and bio-behavioural science around HIV. He received a scholarship and fellowships to continue university education and training in Canada and the US for a further 11 years. He received his doctoral qualifications in psychiatry, neurology, and immunology with a 100% grade point average. This was followed by three post-doctoral fellowships in immunology, neurological and social psychiatry at Tufts New England Medical School, University of Michigan Medical School, and the University of California San Francisco School of Medicine.

Dr Whitaker continued his work in social justice around health during his studies and led the international response to anti-HIV immigration and travels laws in the USA. Based on his published research in public health with Richard Edwards, he prompted the International AIDS Society to boycott the US as the location of any future IAS conferences until the laws were changed. The bans were lifted in 2009 and the subsequent IAS conference was held in Washington, DC.

Dr Whitaker has been an Expert Adviser to the Department of Health UK and a member of numerous committees for specialised commissioning and expert advice on medical research and health service delivery, while also acting as a referee for the British Medical Journal, Blood, AIDS, and being on the editorial board for the International Journal of User-Driven Healthcare. He has published over 70 academic and policy papers in the fields of psychiatry, immunology, neurology, and public health, most as first author, and has had honorary senior fellowships at various universities. Currently, he acts as an international forensic expert in psychiatry and public health for the Courts, with cases in the UK, Iran, Australia, and Poland, specialising in disability, personal injury, clinical negligence, and occupational health. In 2015, he extended his work to speaking engagements, having often given lectures and speeches at Universities and Charity events in the US, UK, and mainland Europe. His main topics for speaking engagements cover integrated patient-centered health services, software and app design for health, and creating accountability across health systems.

Personal health
In 1993, following his third post-doctoral fellowship, Whitaker was diagnosed with AIDS at the age of 30. Shortly afterwards he had a stroke, which left him with visual, communicative, cognitive, and mobility problems. This required brain surgery that left him with epilepsy. This was followed by a number of years of intensive rehabilitation. In 2006, he was again given less than six months to live because of medications for HIV interacting with his stroke-associated brain-injury, which was misdiagnosed for two years. Due to his extensive experience of health services during this time, including a number of episodes of malpractice, he founded the Tuke Institute in 2007.

The Tuke Institute 
The Tuke Institute is an independent research organisation of international scientists, clinicians and other professionals that promotes a biopsychosocial framework for integrated health-services. A significant proportion of its contributors have chronic illnesses themselves and wish to change health-services for the better. The Tuke Institute researches patient-centredness with the primary focus on how best to help patients get well and stay well. Its methods include measuring an individual's health from the patient's perspective, measuring the effectiveness of a health-service in terms of functional health outcomes rather than biomarkers of disease, and policy and software-development to empower patients to participate in the co-delivery, audit, and governance of services. The institute also provides traineeships for graduate students wishing to gain experience in the translation of health-science into policy and practice.

Honours 
In 2004, Whitaker was awarded a Police Commendation for bravery in the apprehension of an armed and violent robber.

He was appointed Officer of the Order of the British Empire (OBE) in the 2022 Birthday Honours for services to charity and public health.

References

External links 
 Chairman's page on the Tuke Institute Website
 "Rupert Whitaker: 'We have to see patients as people, not collections of diseases'". Interview in The Guardian, 1 February 2011.
 
Webpage: Expert witness in Psychiatry, Psychology, and Public Health

Living people
1963 births
Alumni of the College of St Hild and St Bede, Durham
Alumni of Bedford College, London
University of Toronto alumni
People educated at Lord Wandsworth College
English LGBT people
People with HIV/AIDS
University of Michigan alumni
HIV/AIDS activists
Officers of the Order of the British Empire
English psychiatrists
British immunologists